Adult Contemporary is a chart published by Billboard ranking the top-performing songs in the United States in the adult contemporary music (AC) market, based on weekly airplay data from radio stations compiled by Broadcast Data Systems.

In the issue of Billboard dated January 7, Australian singer Sia reached number one with "Unstoppable"; the song, originally released in 2016, had experienced fresh popularity on social media sites.  As of the issue dated March 18, the song has occupied the top spot for 11 consecutive weeks.

Chart history

References

External links
 Current Billboard Adult Contemporary chart

2023
Number-one adult contemporary singles
United States Adult Contemporary